Stine Hovland (born 31 January 1991) is a Norwegian football defender, who plays for Arna-Bjørnar in the Toppserien and the Norway national team. A relatively late bloomer, Hovland did not play in the Norwegian Toppserien until she was 24 years old and she made her national team debut at 27 years old.

Club career
Hovland joined Bergen-based Sandviken from Kaupanger in December 2013 and went on to be an important player and club captain. In her first season Sandviken were promoted to the Toppserien as 1. divisjon champions. In 2018 she helped Sandviken reach the Norwegian Women's Cup final, which they lost 4–0 to LSK Kvinner FK.

In April 2019, Hovland was reported to be a transfer target for professional clubs A.C. Milan and West Ham United. She signed for Milan in July.

Career statistics

International career
In November 2018, Hovland won her first cap for the senior Norway women's national football team, in a 4–1 friendly defeat by Japan at Tottori Bank Bird Stadium. She was also included in the 2019 Algarve Cup-winning squad and secured her place in Norway's 2019 FIFA Women's World Cup panel.

Personal life
Hovland's brother Even is also an international footballer. The siblings were team mates in their local youth team. At the time of the 2019 FIFA Women's World Cup, Hovland was not a professional footballer. She had to take annual leave from her day job as a preschool teacher to attend the tournament in France.

References

External links
 
 Norwegian National Team profile 

1991 births
Living people
Norwegian women's footballers
Norwegian educators
Norway women's international footballers
Women's association football defenders
Toppserien players
People from Høyanger
SK Brann Kvinner players
2019 FIFA Women's World Cup players
A.C. Milan Women players
Sportspeople from Vestland